Jvel, previously known as Joel, is a Spanish dance and electropop singer-songwriter who started his career in 2005. He has collaborated with many important names of the Spanish electronic music scene and he has released three albums so far and many singles.

Biography 
Jvel was born in Las Palmas de Gran Canaria (Canary Islands) in 1985. Since he was young he started feeling interested in electronic music and when he was still a teenager, he started performing in pubs in his hometown. Some years later to pursue a musical career he moved to Madrid, where he met musicians and producers such as Marko Katier, producer of artists and bands such as Marta Sánchez or La quinta estación, with whom he started recording his own material.

Concurrent with his recording work, Jvel started composing his own songs and performing in discos and music festivals. He met and worked with more producers and musicians, and in 2009, he started presenting his original songs in live performances. One year later, he started studying musical production and composed new tracks, this time in English.

In 2011, Jvel was discovered by Carlos Jean, and collaborated in the seventh track of the album "El plan B", entitled "Keep the trance". After that, he started collaborating with the DJ's Arake and David Van Bylen, who have remixed songs by artists such as Raphael, Amaia Montero and Soraya Arnelas amongst others. In 2012, his song "Now or never" was released and entered in many music charts, which is remarkable taking into account that he didn't have the support of a great record label.

In 2015, Jvel's first English album, "Genealogical" is released. He shot a music video for the title track and the album debuted in the 37th place of the iTunes chart.

After this first release, Jvel released his following singles and albums in Spanish, his mother tongue.

Music style 
Jvel's music has a heavy influence of electronic music, specially from styles such as dance, techno and synthpop combining danceable tracks with ballads and more down-tempo songs. His lyrics and his music videos focus mainly on LGBT themes and show emotions such as melancholy, vulnerability, passion, sorrow and liberation.

Discography

Studio albums 

 Genealogical (2015)
 Interestelar (2017)
 1985 (2019)

Singles 

 Now or never (2012)
 Cuento a los hipócritas (I'm counting the hypocrites) (2016)
 Cuatro días sin dormir (Four days without sleeping) (2017)
 Tierra (Earth) (2018)
 La nube (The cloud) (2018)
 No me pongo p'a llevar (II'm not for carrying) (2019)
 Cosas mías (Things of mine) (2019)
 Tarta de limón (Lemon cake) (2019)

References 

Spanish singer-songwriters
Spanish male singers
Spanish electronic musicians
1985 births
Living people